The Crafton Hills are a low mountain range of the Transverse Ranges System, in Southern California.

They are located near Yucaipa, east of the city of San Bernardino in San Bernardino County. The range is south of the San Bernardino Mountains foothills.

References 

Mountain ranges of San Bernardino County, California
Transverse Ranges
Hills of California
Yucaipa, California
Mountain ranges of Southern California